The 2021 Southland Conference men's basketball tournament was the postseason men's basketball tournament for the 2020–21 season in the Southland Conference. The tournament took place from March 9–13, 2021. The tournament winner received an automatic invitation to the 2021 NCAA Division I men's basketball tournament.

Seeds
Teams were seeded by record within the conference, with a tie–breaker system to seed teams with identical conference records. Only the top 10 teams in the conference qualified for the tournament. The top two seeds received triple byes into the semifinals in the merit-based format. The No. 3 and No. 4 seeds received double byes to the quarterfinals. Stephen F. Austin is serving a postseason ban and did not compete.

Schedule

Source

Bracket

See also
2021 Southland Conference women's basketball tournament
Southland Conference men's basketball tournament

References

External links
 2021 Southland Conference basketball tournament

Southland Conference men's basketball tournament
2020–21 Southland Conference men's basketball season
Southland Conference men's basketball
Sports competitions in Katy, Texas
College basketball tournaments in Texas